Therioplectes gigas is horse fly in the family Tabanidae. The species was first described by Johann Friedrich Wilhelm Herbst in 1787.

Distribution
This species is present in most of Central and Southern Europe.

Description

References

External links
 Diptera.info
 Galerie du Monde des insectes

Tabanidae
Insects described in 1787
Taxa named by Johann Friedrich Wilhelm Herbst
Diptera of Europe